"Vegas" is a song by American rapper and singer Doja Cat. It was released through Kemosabe Records and RCA Records as the lead single from the soundtrack for Baz Luhrmann's Elvis Presley biopic, Elvis, on May 6, 2022. The song was produced by Rogét Chahayed and Yeti Beats. It interpolates a sample of Shonka Dukureh's recording of the song "Hound Dog", which was written by Jerry Leiber and Mike Stoller, first recorded by Big Mama Thornton (who Dukureh plays in the film) in 1952 and notably covered by Presley. The official music video for the song was released on June 2, 2022. It received a nomination at the 65th Annual Grammy Awards for Best Rap Performance.

Composition
The song's lyrics refer to a man who was an "underwhelming lover" whom Doja Cat feels "never deserved her attention".

Critical reception
Writing for Consequence, Carys Anderson felt that Doja Cat "lives up to the challenge" of Luhrmann "pairing historical content with modern music", calling it "Ain't Shit" meets "Hound Dog". Wongo Okon of Uproxx remarked that Doja "raps with a vengeance".

Commercial performance
"Vegas" peaked at number ten on the US Billboard Hot 100, becoming Doja's seventh top-ten single. The song also reached number one on the Pop Songs chart, making it the first solo soundtrack song to reach the top of that chart since Justin Timberlake's "Can't Stop the Feeling!" in 2016. It also makes her the artist with the most number ones on Pop Songs this decade among women.

Live performances
Prior to its official release, Doja Cat performed "Vegas" for the first time during the 2022 Coachella Valley Music and Arts Festival. She was joined by Shonka Dukureh, who performed the sample she provided for the song.

Music video
The music video was released on June 2, 2022. It is directed by Child, and features a cameo by Dukureh, who portrays Big Mama Thornton in Elvis.

Charts

Weekly charts

Year-end charts

Certifications

Release history

References

2022 singles
2022 songs
Doja Cat songs
Kemosabe Records singles
RCA Records singles
Song recordings produced by Yeti Beats
Songs written by Doja Cat
Songs written by Jerry Leiber and Mike Stoller
Songs written by Rogét Chahayed
Songs written by Yeti Beats